The Cavern deities of the underworld were ancient Egyptian minor deities charged with punishing the damned souls by beheading and devouring them.

Description and partition 

The Egyptians believed that in the underworld, the Duat, there were at least twelve caves and caverns inhabited by terrible deities and supernatural creatures that would feed on the souls of the wicked. Several funerary papyri – in addition to the wall decorations of some tombs in the Valley of the Kings and the southern hall of the Osireion at Abydos – list these deities involved in the extermination (usually by beheading) of the enemies of the sun-god Ra and of his daughter Maat, goddess of truth and justice. In particular, these creatures are systematically listed in the "Spell of the Twelve Caves" known from a papyrus (Cairo 24742) dating back to the reign of Pharaoh Amenhotep II (c. 1427–1401 BC) of the 18th Dynasty.

The first seven caverns contained groups of three mummiform and three anthropomorphic deities, two male and one female in each triad. From the 8th to the 20th cavern, one would find divinities in variable numbers: in the 8th, for example, there were seven groups along with individual divinities, and at least twenty of them in the 9th. It is normal to find, next to the lists of names and positions of these other gods – beneath their representations – columns of offers prescribed for them too, along with the beneficent deeds that the dead would achieve. Once pacified, in fact, these deities could facilitate the free movement in the hereafter, providing nourishment and light in the darkness.

Deities of the first eleven caves (Hart) 
The tomb (KV2) of Pharaoh Ramesses IV (c. 1155–1149 BC) in the Valley of the Kings, and the Book of the Dead, list the cavern deities hereafter selected by the British egyptologist George Hart:

Deities in the 10th cavern (Wilkinson) 
In particular, the Egyptologist Richard H. Wilkinson thus grouped the deities and the supernatural creatures residing in the 10th cave, along with their beneficent deeds once the deceased successfully tamed them:

See also 
 Gate deities of the underworld

References

Notes

Bibliography 
 Hart, George, A Dictionary of Egyptian Gods and Goddesses, Routledge, 1986, . 
 Wilkinson, Richard H., The Complete Gods and Goddesses of Ancient Egypt, Thames & Hudson, 2003, .

Groups of Egyptian deities
Egyptian death gods
Egyptian underworld